Borsele is a municipality in the southwestern Netherlands on Zuid-Beveland.

The name of the municipality is spelled with a single s; the name of the eponymous village is Borssele, spelled with double s.

The municipality is mainly known for the Borssele Nuclear Power Station and the Central Storage for Radioactive Waste.

Population centres

Topography

Transport
The Western Scheldt Tunnel is from Ellewoutsdijk to Terneuzen in Zeelandic Flanders.

Notable people

 Adrianus Barlandus [1486 in Baarland – 1538) a Dutch historian of merit
 Hans Warren (1921 in Borssele – 2001) a Dutch writer

Sport
 Dingenis de Wilde (1885 in Heinkenszand – 1947) a Dutch sports shooter, competed at the 1924 Summer Olympics
 Cees Priem (born 1950 in Ovezande) a retired professional road bicycle racer, competed at the 1972 Summer Olympics
 Jan Raas (born 1952 in Heinkenszand, near Goes) a Dutch former professional cyclist
 Angelique van der Meet (born 1991 in 's-Heer Abtskerke) a Dutch tennis player

Gallery

References

External links

 

 
Municipalities of Zeeland
Zuid-Beveland